Brittany Mariko Ishibashi (born November 2, 1980) is an American actress. She has had starring television roles on Political Animals, Supernatural and Runaways. Ishibashi has had roles in films such as Teenage Mutant Ninja Turtles: Out of the Shadows.

Early life and education
Ishibashi was born and raised in Orange County, California and comes from a family of entertainers. Her father, Gerald Ishibashi, is a concert promoter and musician. Her mother, Lisa Ishibashi, is a singer. Her grandmother, Mary Nomura, is a singer who became known as the songbird of Manzanar. Her two sisters, Brianna Ishibashi and Brooke Ishibashi, are actresses and writers.

She attended Jordan Elementary School, Santiago Middle School, and El Modena High School. She majored in theater at the University of California Los Angeles (UCLA).

Career
Ishibashi's first big break came when JJ Abrams cast her in Felicity just out of high school. She continued her formal education at UCLA School of Theater, Film and Television while continuing to build her resume outside of classes. Ishibashi has been consistently working ever since, with recurring roles and guest appearances in over three dozen television shows, including The Office, Grey's Anatomy, and Supernatural. After an exciting debut at Comic-Con, Ishibashi reprised her role as Maggie Zeddmore in the Supernatural spin-off Ghostfacers, which has developed a global fan following. She has also worked on nearly two dozen films and multimedia projects, under the direction of such creatives as Joan Scheckel, Robert Redford, and Danny DeVito.

Ishibashi is probably best known for her role as Anne Ogami on USA Network's Golden Globe and Emmy-nominated series, Political Animals. Ishibashi was next seen in the original Netflix series, Grace and Frankie, and starring in Wong Fu Productions first feature film, Everything Before Us, released June 3, 2015.
 
In early 2015, Ishibashi launched her production shingle, Mana Moments, with a focus on comedic, female driven content.

Ishibashi played Karai in Teenage Mutant Ninja Turtles: Out of the Shadows, the sequel to Teenage Mutant Ninja Turtles, released in theaters on June 3, 2016.

In 2017, Ishibashi joined the cast of the Hulu original series Runaways as Tina Minoru.

Personal life
On May 29, 2011, Ishibashi married Jeff Horowitz at the Mauna Kea Beach Hotel on the Big Island of Hawaii. SNL alum Nasim Pedrad was the officiant at their wedding. The couple lives in Los Angeles with their son and daughter.

Filmography

Film

Television

Web

See also
 Japanese Americans in Los Angeles

References

External links

1980 births
20th-century American actresses
21st-century American actresses
Living people
American actresses of Japanese descent
American film actresses
American film actors of Asian descent
American television actresses
Actresses from Orange County, California
University of California, Los Angeles alumni